"Sleeping Single In a Double Bed" is a song written by Kye Fleming and Dennis Morgan, and recorded by American country music artist Barbara Mandrell.  It was released in August 1978 as the first single from her album Moods.

Tracklist
Dave Aude Remix
"Sleeping Single In a Double Bed" (Dave Aude Remix) - 3:20

Charts
The song was Mandrell's twentieth solo hit on Billboard magazine's Hot Country Singles and her first of six #1 singles on that chart.  The single stayed at the top for three weeks (November 1978) and spent a total of eleven weeks in the top 40.

Weekly charts

Year-end charts

Awards
In early 1980, the song won an American Music Award for Favorite Country Single

References

External links
  

Barbara Mandrell songs
1978 singles
Songs about loneliness
Songs written by Kye Fleming
Songs written by Dennis Morgan (songwriter)
Song recordings produced by Tom Collins (record producer)
ABC Records singles
1978 songs